The Gamble may refer to:

The Gamble (1916 film), an American short silent film
The Gamble (1971 film), an Iranian film
The Gamble (1988 film), an Italian comedy film
"The Gamble" (The O.C.), a 2003 television episode
"The Gamble" (The Onedin Line), a 1976 television episode
The Gamble (book), a 2009 book by Thomas E. Ricks about the Iraq War

See also 
 Gamble (disambiguation)